Cyclophellitol is a potent irreversible inhibitor of beta-glucosidases. It is a cyclitol mimic of beta-glucose with an epoxide group in place of the acetal group found in glucosides. When recognized, cyclophellitol undergoes an acid-catalyzed ring-opening addition reaction with the catalytic nucleophile of a retaining glycoside hydrolase. The resulting ester linkage cannot be hydrolyzed by the normal catalytic machinery of the enzyme, resulting in irreversible inhibition.

Cyclophellitol was originally isolated from a species of Phellinus mushroom found in Japan. The first total chemical synthesis of cyclophellitol was demonstrated by Tatsuta et al. Synthetic derivatives of cyclophellitol have been used for the detection of enzymes such as glucocerebrosidase, deficiency of which results in Gaucher's disease.

References 

Cyclitols